The Journal of Economic Issues is an academic journal of economics. The current editor-in-chief is William Waller (Hobart and William Smith Colleges).
It is published by Taylor & Francis on behalf of the Association for Evolutionary Economics.

References

External links 
 

Economics journals
Quarterly journals
English-language journals
Publications established in 1967
Taylor & Francis academic journals